Yang Yang (born December 8, 1963 in Nanjing, Jiangsu) is a former Chinese badminton player.

He is one of the four badminton players in the world to have won two World Badminton Championships men's singles titles consecutively (1987, 1989), the others being Lin Dan, Chen Long, Kento Momota and Viktor Axelsen. He also won the men's singles gold medal when badminton was a demonstration sport at the 1988 Summer Olympics. He possessed great agility, quick footwork, accurate power, and coolness under pressure, and is widely regarded as one of the finest singles players in the history of the sport.

Career
Yang began training in 1975, when he was 12 years old. He was recruited by the Chinese national team in 1983. He won his first Chinese national championship title in 1984. In 1985, he won the Hong Kong Open by defeating Morten Frost. In 1986, he won the Japan Open and the Hong Kong Open for the second straight year, and also helped China to regain the Thomas Cup (men's world team championship) from Indonesia by winning key matches. In 1988 he also won the Olympic exhibition event in Seoul (badminton became an official Olympic sport at the next games in Barcelona). In 1989 he added the venerable All-England Championships to his tally; thus, by twenty-five, he captured all the titles by which "greatness" in the sport is generally measured.

China's Golden Generation
As a member of China's golden badminton generation of the 1980s which included the almost equally brilliant singles stars Zhao Jianhua and Xiong Guobao, Yang Yang played an important role in making China the major world badminton superpower. His play was instrumental in China's consecutive Thomas Cup (men's world team) titles in 1986, 1988, and 1990.

Retirement
In 1991, he retired as a player and started coaching in Malaysia. In the very next year, he guided Malaysia to its first Thomas Cup victory in 25 years, the only occasion since 1967 in which neither Indonesia nor China has won the cup. He then stayed in Malaysia to develop his business for badminton equipment. He returned to China in year 2000, and opened a badminton club named after himself in Nanjing.

Achievements

Olympic Games (exhibition) 
Men's singles

World Championships 
Men's singles

World Cup 
Men's singles

Asian Games 
Men's singles

Asian Championships 
Men's singles

IBF World Grand Prix (9 titles, 1 runners-up)
The World Badminton Grand Prix sanctioned by International Badminton Federation (IBF) from 1983 to 2006.

Men's singles

Sources
Badmintoncn.com: Yang Yang 
羽壇“王中王”回歸故鄉續寫傳奇 

Badminton players from Jiangsu
Living people
1963 births
Asian Games medalists in badminton
Badminton players at the 1986 Asian Games
Badminton players at the 1990 Asian Games
Sportspeople from Nanjing
World No. 1 badminton players
Chinese male badminton players
Asian Games gold medalists for China
Asian Games silver medalists for China
Badminton players at the 1988 Summer Olympics
Medalists at the 1986 Asian Games
Medalists at the 1990 Asian Games
Chinese badminton coaches